Mascotte is a 1920 German silent film directed by Felix Basch and starring Gretl Basch, Paul Biensfeldt, and Hanni Reinwald.

The film's sets were designed by the art director Kurt Richter.

Cast
Gretl Basch as Ballhaus-Anna
Felix Basch as Lebemann
Mizzi Schütz as Mutter Hanke
Paul Biensfeldt as Diener
Kurt Ehrle
Fred Immler

Sophie Pagay
Hermann Picha
Hanni Reinwald
Anna von Palen
Emmy Wyda

References

Bibliography

External links

Films of the Weimar Republic
German silent feature films
Films directed by Felix Basch
UFA GmbH films
German black-and-white films
German drama films
1920 drama films
Films based on German novels
Silent drama films
1920s German films